On July 4, 2002, a lone gunman opened fire at the ticket counter of El Al, Israel's national airline, at Los Angeles International Airport in Los Angeles, California, United States. In the terrorist attack, two people were killed, and four others were injured before an El Al security guard fatally shot the gunman.

Attack 

On July 4, 2002, at around 11:30 a.m., a lone gunman approached the El Al ticket counter inside the Tom Bradley International Terminal at the Los Angeles International Airport, pulled out two Glock pistols and started shooting at the 90 passengers standing in the line. Initially, the assailant killed 25-year-old Customer Service Agent Victoria Hen, standing behind the counter, with a gunshot to the chest. Later, the assailant opened fire at the passengers as they huddled nearby and killed 46-year-old bystander Yaakov Aminov. In addition, he injured four other bystanders.

The terrorist used a .45-caliber handgun in the shooting. In addition, he had a 9 mm handgun, a 6-inch knife and extra magazines with ammunition for both guns.

After the gunman fired ten bullets at the crowd, one of El Al's security guards, who was unarmed, managed to knock him down. Meanwhile, El Al's security officer, Chaim Sapir, ran to the scene but was stabbed by the assailant with a knife. Despite this, Sapir managed to draw his pistol and shoot the gunman in the chest, killing him.

Perpetrator 
Hesham Mohamed Hadayet (July 4, 1961 – July 4, 2002), a 41-year-old Egyptian national, was identified as the assailant. He emigrated to the United States in 1992, arriving on a tourist visa but applied for political asylum. The Immigration and Naturalization Service denied his asylum request in 1995, but the Post Office returned a letter notifying him as undeliverable. No further efforts appear to have been made to locate and deport him. Shortly before his scheduled 1997 deportation, his wife won the Diversity Immigrant Visa lottery, enabling both to become legal residents.

In Egypt, he had been arrested for being a member of Al-Gama'a al-Islamiyya, an Islamist group. He denied the accusation to U.S. immigration authorities. He said he was a member of Asad ibn al-Furat Mosque Association, a group that aimed to "understand truly and apply Islamic law in the 20th century under any circumstances."

Hadayet had a green card (through the Diversity Visa Lottery), which allowed him to work as a limousine driver and to apply for United States citizenship after five years. He was married and had at least one child. At the time of the shooting, Hadayet was living in Irvine, California. He committed the shooting on his 41st birthday.

Aftermath 
In September 2002, federal investigators concluded that Hadayet hoped to influence U.S. government policy in favor of the Palestinians and that the incident was a terrorist act.

See also 
 1985 Rome and Vienna airport attacks
 2013 Los Angeles International Airport shooting
 Fort Lauderdale airport shooting
 List of attacks on Jewish institutions in the United States
 List of homicides in California

References 

Islamic terrorism in California
2002 murders in the United States
Terrorist attacks on airports
Terrorist incidents in the United States in 2002
2002 mass shootings in the United States
Mass shootings in the United States
Los Angeles International Airport
2002 in Los Angeles
Antisemitic attacks and incidents in the United States
Antisemitism in California
Murder in Los Angeles
Terrorist incidents in Los Angeles
July 2002 events in the United States
Attacks in the United States in 2002
Mass shootings in California
Attacks on buildings and structures in the United States